New Franklin is an unincorporated community in Franklin County, in the U.S. state of Pennsylvania.

History
The first settlement at New Franklin was made in 1795. A post office called New Franklin was established in 1882, and remained in operation until 1907.

References

Unincorporated communities in Franklin County, Pennsylvania
Unincorporated communities in Pennsylvania